Such'on station is a railway station in greater Tanch'ŏn city, South Hamgyŏng province, North Korea, on the Kŭmgol Line of the Korean State Railway. It was opened on 4 December 1943 along with the rest of the Tongam–Paekkŭmsan section of the line.

References

Railway stations in North Korea
Railway stations opened in 1943
1943 establishments in Korea